Wellington College is a public school (English fee-charging boarding and day school) in the village of Crowthorne, Berkshire, England. Wellington is a registered charity and currently educates roughly 1,200 pupils, between the ages of 13 and 18. The college was built as a national monument to the first Duke of Wellington (1769–1852), in whose honour it is named. Queen Victoria laid the foundation stone in 1856 and inaugurated the School's public opening on 29 January 1859.

Many former Wellington pupils fought in the trenches during the First World War, a conflict in which 707 of them lost their lives, many volunteering for military service immediately after leaving school. A further 501 former pupils were killed in action in the Second World War.

The school is a member of the Rugby Group of 18 British public schools and is also a member of the G20 Schools group.

History
Wellington College was granted a royal charter in 1853 as "The Royal and Religious Foundation of the Wellington College", and was opened in 1859. Its first Master, which is the title of the headmaster, was Edward White Benson, who later became Archbishop of Canterbury. The college's Visitor was H.M. the Queen.

Originally, the school educated sons of deceased officers who had held commissions in the Army. In 1952 a Supplementary Royal Charter extended the privilege of eligibility to the orphan sons of deceased officers of the Royal Navy, Royal Marines and Royal Air Force. By the 1960s, the school was considering becoming co-educational, but for some years the lack of financial resources prevented it from doing so. The first girls were admitted into the Sixth Form in the 1970s, and the school became fully co-educational in 2005. A recent change to the scheme of reduced fees early in 2006 extended the privilege to the orphan children of deceased servicemen or servicewomen of His Majesty's Armed Forces irrespective of rank, and to the orphan children of persons who, in the sole opinion of the Governors, have died in acts of selfless bravery. However, only a minority of the children at the school now come from military families.

On 6 September 2013, readers of The Week magazine voted Wellington College "The Most Forward-Thinking School in the UK", and four days later Tatler magazine chose Wellington College as the "Best Senior School in Britain", at its Schools Awards evening in London.

The Wellington Academy
Wellington has sponsored the founding of a new independent state school in Wiltshire, The Wellington Academy, which opened in 2009.

Wellington College International
Wellington is in partnership with Wellington College International Tianjin, in the city of Tianjin in mainland China, modelled on the buildings and ethos of the college, and which opened in August 2011. Wellington is also partnered with Wellington College International Shanghai and Huili School Shanghai in the city of Shanghai, and Wellington College International Hangzhou and Huili School Hangzhou in the city of Hangzhou (also in mainland China), and Wellington College International Bangkok in Thailand.

Architecture
The college buildings were designed by John Shaw, Jr., who had previously worked as an architect for Eton College. For its time, the design of the College was unusual compared to the popular form, but Prince Albert, who assisted in choosing the architect, was more interested in Shaw's classical approach, having already seen the architect's design for the old Royal Naval School in New Cross, London. The main buildings were designed in a style loosely termed "French Grand Rococo",. The chapel, notably only half its originally intended size, was designed by Sir Gilbert Scott. There have been several modern buildings, the best of which follow Shaw's grand rococo style: for example, the new Nicholson modern foreign-languages building.

The college was used as a filming location for the Netflix series The Crown as a stand-in for Kensington Palace (designed by Sir Christopher Wren) in seasons 2, 3, 4 and 5 first as the home of Princess Margaret and then of Diana, Princess of Wales. One of the college's original mottos Heroum Filii is visible in a scene of the Queen arriving at the palace and the college's official motto, Virtutis Fortuna Comes, is visible in a scene of the Queen leaving the palace.

Location
Wellington College stands on a  estate in South-East England, near Reading and Sandhurst. The grounds of the college include a 9-hole golf course, extensive woodland, and many playing fields, particularly those for cricket and rugby. The woodland area of the college is listed as a local nature reserve called Edgbarrow Woods. The grounds also contain a Site of Special Scientific Interest, Wellington College Bog.

Academic results
In 2019, 57% of pupils scored A*-A for their A-Levels examination, whereas 83% scored A*-A for their GCSEs. The school had an average IB score of 40.2.

Masters of Wellington College

Former pupils

 Historian P. J. Marshall
 Field marshal Sir Claude Auchinleck
 Field marshal Sir Geoffrey Baker
 Military historian Sir Michael Howard
 Clergyman and author David Watson
 Architect Sir Nicholas Grimshaw
 Impressionist Rory Bremner
 Pakistani politician Hammad Azhar
 Adolphus Cambridge, 1st Marquess of Cambridge
 Theravāda Buddhist monk Ñāṇavīra Thera (born Harold Edward Musson)
 Author Sebastian Faulks
 Language school pioneer John Haycraft
 Political journalist Robin Oakley
 Actor Sir Christopher Lee
 Liberal politician George Ferguson who became the first elected Mayor of Bristol (2012–2016)
 Writer George Orwell (Easter Term 1917 only, in May 1917 he became a King's Scholar at Eton)
 Poet Gavin Ewart
 Composer John Gardner
 World champion motor racing driver James Hunt
Rugby union player and first-class cricketer Simon Clarke
 Former Leader of the House of Lords Lord Strathclyde
 Journalist and television presenter, Peter Snow
 The UK Pop Idol winner Will Young
 Revenge actor Josh Bowman
 BRIT Award-nominated singer, Nerina Pallot
 Rugby Union players, James Haskell and the brothers Max and Thom Evans
Actor Robert Morley
Actress Caggie Dunlop
Actress Elize du Toit
Actress Ellie Bamber
Olympic athlete Morgan Lake
 Michael Knatchbull, 5th Baron Brabourne
 Soros family
 Getty family
 de Betak family
 de Givenchy family
 Prince Christian Victor of Schleswig-Holstein
 Prince Maurice of Battenberg
 Alexander Mountbatten, 1st Marquess of Carisbrooke
 Count Nikolai Tolstoy
 Prince Constantine Alexios of Greece and Denmark
 Prince Achileas-Andreas of Greece and Denmark
 Princess Maria-Olympia of Greece and Denmark
 Patrick Head, Formula One Engineer

Sport

Wellington College was one of the 21 founding members of the Rugby Football Union, and pupils at the school have historically played schoolboy rugby to the highest standard. In 2008, the College became the first school to win the Daily Mail Cup at both U15 and U18 level in the same year, beating Millfield School and St Benedict's School, Ealing in their respective finals at Twickenham on 2 April 2008. In 2014/15 Wellington College 1st XV won the Rugby World School Team of the Year award, in addition to the National Rugby Awards Team of the Year Prize. A number of Old Wellingtonians play professional rugby union, including: James Haskell (England), Paul Doran-Jones (England), Max Lahiff (Bath Rugby), Max Evans and Thom Evans (Scotland), Sam Aspland-Robinson (Harlequins), Rory Brand (London Irish), Max Lahiff (Bristol Bears), and Madison Hughes (USA 7s).

The school has one of only around 20 racquets courts in the UK, one of 27 real tennis courts in the UK and until recently three Eton Fives courts, now a café bar as part of the sports club.

The school has a clay pigeon shooting range on site.

Wellington College has been named as number one golf college in the UK on a few occasions with wins in 2009 at St Andrews and 2012 at Carnoustie in the Independent Schools Golf Association National Finals.

Controversies
The school has been the subject of reports on bullying. In response to criticism, in 2006, it  introduced 'well-being lessons' to the curriculum, in conjunction with a team at Cambridge University.

In 2005 the school was one of fifty of the country's leading independent schools found guilty of running an illegal price-fixing cartel, exposed by The Times newspaper, which had allowed them to drive up fees for thousands of parents. Each school was required to pay a nominal penalty of £10,000 and all agreed to make ex-gratia payments totalling three million pounds into a trust designed to benefit pupils who attended the schools during the period in respect of which fee information was shared. However, Mrs Jean Scott, the head of the Independent Schools Council, said that independent schools had always been exempt from anti-cartel rules applied to business, were following a long-established procedure in sharing the information with each other, and were unaware of the change in the law (on which they had not been consulted). She wrote to John Vickers, the OFT director-general, saying, "They are not a group of businessmen meeting behind closed doors to fix the price of their products to the disadvantage of the consumer. They are schools that have quite openly continued to follow a long-established practice because they were unaware that the law had changed."

Houses
There are 17 houses at Wellington. The vast majority are composed of boarders with a small number of day pupils also, although two, Wellesley and Raglan, are day-pupil exclusive. Each house is either an 'in-house' or an 'out-house': in-houses are located within the main school buildings and quads while out-houses are located elsewhere on the college grounds. Each house has aspects distinguishing it from other houses, such as its own colours, insignia, and crest (with the crest of each house being incorporated into one of each of the stained glass windows of the college chapel). Each house was named in honour of a significant figure in history, usually although not exclusively figures associated with the Duke of Wellington.

The Orange, Combermere, Hopetoun, and Anglesey were all formerly boys' houses but converted to girls' houses between 2005 and 2011.

The Old Wellingtonian Society
The Old Wellingtonian Society is the alumni society for the college and was founded in 1890. The Old Wellingtonian Society was set up to further the interests of the college and its past and present members, and to keep former pupils in touch with each other and with the school.

See also
 List of notable Old Wellingtonians
 :Category:People educated at Wellington College, Berkshire
 Wellington College International Shanghai, a subsidiary school in China
 Wellington College International Tianjin, a subsidiary school in China

References

Further reading
 - about Driver's experiences as Master at the school

External links

 Wellington College website
 Old Wellingtonians Society – alumni website
 Website of Old Wellingtonian Lodge #3404
 Profile on the Independent Schools Council website
 Profile at The Good Schools Guide
 The Wellington Academy website
 Wellington Academy International Tainjin

1859 establishments in England
Educational institutions established in 1859
Private schools in Bracknell Forest
Racquets venues
Real tennis venues
Round Square schools
Member schools of the Headmasters' and Headmistresses' Conference
International Baccalaureate schools in England
Boarding schools in Berkshire
Monuments and memorials in Berkshire
Schools with a royal charter
Grade II* listed buildings in Berkshire
Cricket grounds in Berkshire